The Blue Room is a 2014 French erotic thriller film directed by and starring Mathieu Amalric. It is based on a novel by Georges Simenon. It was screened in the Un Certain Regard section at the 2014 Cannes Film Festival.

Plot
Julien works as an agricultural contractor, is married to Delphine, and has a daughter, Suzanne. The pharmacist Esther Despierre, whom Julien knew from his youth, is married to a schoolmate of Julien, the always sickly Nicolas. One day, Esther meets Julien again and accuses him of having kissed all the women, but not her. She then makes him kiss her, and a passionate affair begins. In the following months, they irregularly meet in the blue room of a local hotel. When Esther asks him whether he could imagine a life with her, Julien affirms.

At one date with Esther, Julien sees Nicolas seemingly approaching the hotel, so he has to flee. Later, Julien goes to a vacation with his family to the sea and has no contact with Esther even after the holiday. He receives letters from her with short notes, which he perceives as increasingly menacing. One day, Julien learns that Nicolas had a fit and died. Although Nicolas was seriously ill, his death does not appear to be natural for Julien. When he again receives a letter from Esther with the text "À toi!", he is shocked and destroys the letter as he did before. Some time later, on Delphine's request, he has to pick up a drug from the pharmacy where Esther works. Besides drugs, Esther also hands him a pack of plum jam that arrived for his wife. Julien delivers the jam home and leaves. When he returns, he finds his house full of police as his wife is found dead—obviously because of a poisoned plum jam. Julien is arrested.

Investigators see his leaving the wife with the poisoned jam as a deception maneuver. The long period that it took Julien to deliver the jam to his wife is ruled as a proof that it is Julien who poisoned the jam. In the court, both Julien and Esther are found guilty and sentenced to a life imprisonment. Esther smiles to Julien hinting that now they are not divided, and they leave the blue courtroom.

Cast
 Mathieu Amalric as Julien Gahyde
 Léa Drucker as Delphine Gahyde
 Stéphanie Cléau as Esther Despierre
 Laurent Poitrenaux as The judge
 Serge Bozon as The cop
 Blutch as The psy
 Mona Jaffart as Suzanne Gahyde 
 Véronique Alain as Nicolas's mother
 Paul Kramer as Julien's lawyer
 Alain Fraitag as Esther's lawyer

Critical response
On Rotten Tomatoes, the film holds an approval rating of 88%, based on 76 reviews, with an average rating of 7/10. The site's critical consensus reads, "The Blue Room proves a sobering study of the dark side of human nature, as well as a coolly assured directorial effort from star and co-writer Mathieu Amalric." On Metacritic the film has a score of 72 out of 100, based on 25 critics, indicating "generally favorable reviews".

Accolades

See also
 The Blue Room (2002)

References

External links
 

2014 films
2014 crime thriller films
2014 psychological thriller films
2010s French-language films
Films about lawyers
Films based on works by Georges Simenon
Films based on Belgian novels
Films directed by Mathieu Amalric
Films produced by Paulo Branco
French crime thriller films
French psychological thriller films
2010s French films